Sericosura mitrata is a species of sea spider within the family Ammotheidae. The species is found near the Antarctic in the Southern Ocean, with the holotype of the species being found off Kemp Land at a depth of 219 meters. Other areas the species has been found includes the Atlantic near Namibia, and in the North Pacific at depths of 106 to 3500 meters.

References 

Animals described in 1944
Pycnogonids
Fauna of the Pacific Ocean
Fauna of the Southern Ocean
Fauna of the Atlantic Ocean